Khanbaghi or Khan Baghi may refer to:
 Khanbaghi, East Azerbaijan
 Khan Baghi, Fars
 Khan Baghi, Kurdistan